Gardinia is a genus of moths in the family Erebidae. The genus was described by William Forsell Kirby in 1892.

Species
Gardinia amynitica Hering, 1925
Gardinia anopla Hering, 1925
Gardinia boliviensis Hering, 1925
Gardinia magnifica (Walker, [1865])
Gardinia paradoxa Hering, 1925

References

External links

Lithosiina
Moth genera